The Geneva Convention on Prisoners of War was signed at Geneva, July 27, 1929. Its official name is the Convention relative to the Treatment of Prisoners of War, Geneva July 27, 1929. It entered into force 19 June 1931. It is this version of the Geneva Conventions which covered the treatment of prisoners of war during World War II. It is the predecessor of the Third Geneva Convention signed in 1949.

On their web site, the International Committee of the Red Cross states that:

General provisions
Article 1 makes explicit reference to Articles 1, 2, and 3 of Hague Convention respecting the laws and customs of war on land (Hague IV), of October 18, 1907, to define who are lawful combatants and so qualify as prisoners of war (POW) on capture. In addition to combatants covered by Hague IV, some civilians are also covered in the section of this Convention called the "Application of the Convention to certain classes of civilians".

Articles 2, 3, and 4 specifies that POWs are prisoners of the Power which holds them and not prisoners of the unit which takes their surrender; that POWs have the right to honor and respect, and that women shall be treated with all the regard due to their sex, and that prisoners of a similar category must be treated in the same way.

Capture
Articles 5 and 6 covers what may and may not be done to a prisoner on capture. If requested, unless too ill to comply, prisoners are bound to give their true name and rank, but they may not be coerced into giving any more information. Prisoners' personal possessions, other than arms and horses, may not be taken from them.

The wording of the 1949 Third Geneva Convention was intentionally altered from that of the 1929 convention so that soldiers who "fall into the power" following surrender or mass capitulation of an enemy are now protected as well as those taken prisoner in the course of fighting. (see Disarmed Enemy Forces)

Captivity

Evacuation of prisoners of war
Articles 7 and 8 states that prisoners should be evacuated from the combat zone within the shortest possible period, and that belligerents are bound mutually to notify each other of their capture of prisoners within the shortest period possible.

Prisoner of war camps
Articles 9 and 10 covers the type of camp in which POWs can be detained. They must be constructed in such a way so that the conditions are similar to those used by the belligerent's own soldiers in base camps. The camps must be located in healthy locations and away from the combat zone. Also, "Belligerents shall, so far as possible, avoid assembling in a single camp prisoners of different races or nationalities." Prisoners may not be used as human shields by being sent to an area where they would be exposed to the fire of the fighting zone or be employed to render by their presence certain points or areas immune from bombardment.

Articles 11, 12, and 13 states, "Food must be of a similar quality and quantity to that of the belligerent's own soldiers, and POWs cannot be denied food as a punishment; A canteen selling local produce and products should be provided. Adequate clothing should be provided; and that sanitary service in camps should be more than sufficient to prevent epidemics."

Articles 14 and 15 covers the provision of medical facilities in each camp.

Articles 16 and 17 covers the provision of religious needs, intellectual diversions and sport facilities.

Articles 18 and 19 covers the internal discipline of a camp which is under the command of a responsible officer.

Articles 20, 21, 22, and 23 states that officers and persons of equivalent status who are prisoners of war shall be treated with the regard due their rank and age and provide more details on what that treatment should be.

Article 24 covers the rate of pay of prisoners of war.

Articles 25 and 26 covers the responsibilities of the detaining authority when transferring prisoners from one location to another. Prisoners must be healthy enough to travel, they must be informed to where they are being transferred; and their personal possessions, including bank accounts, should remain accessible.

Labour of prisoners of war
Articles 27 to 34 covers labour by prisoners of war. Work must fit the rank and health of the prisoners. The work must not be war-related and must be safe work. Remuneration will be agreed between the belligerents and will belong to the prisoner who carries out the work.

Prisoners' relations with the authorities
Articles 42 to 67 covers the prisoners' relations with the authorities. Most of these provisions are covered by the provision that prisoners are under the detaining power's own code of military regulations, with some additional provisions which cover specific prisoner of war issues and some other provisions to protect prisoners of war if the military regulations of the detaining power do not meet a minimum standard. Two specific regulations which differentiate prisoners of war from the detainees' own military regulations, is that no prisoner of war may be deprived of his rank by the detaining Power, and escaped prisoners of war who are retaken before being able to rejoin their own army or to leave the territory occupied by the army which captured them shall be liable only to disciplinary punishment.

Termination of captivity
Articles 68 to 74 states that seriously sick and seriously injured prisoners of war must be repatriated as soon as their condition allows and no repatriated person may be utilized in active military service.

Article 75 covers release at the end of hostilities. The release of prisoners should form part of the armistice. If this is not possible then repatriation of prisoners shall be effected with the least possible delay after the conclusion of peace. This particular provision was to cause problems after World War II because as the surrender of the Axis powers was unconditional (unconditional surrender) there was no armistice, and in the case of Germany a full peace treaty was not signed until the signing of the Treaty on the Final Settlement with Respect to Germany in 1990.

Article 76 covers prisoners of war dying in captivity: they should be honorably buried and their graves marked and maintained properly. Wills and death certificate provisions should be the same as those for the detaining power's own soldiers.

Bureau of relief and information concerning prisoners of war
Articles 77 to 80 covers how and how frequently the Powers should exchange information about prisoners and the details of how relief societies for prisoners of war should be involved in their relief.

Application of the Convention to certain classes of civilians
Article 81 states that individuals who follow the armed forces without directly belonging thereto, who fall into the enemy's hands and whom the latter think expedient to detain, shall be entitled to be treated as prisoners of war. This provision covered military support contractors, civilian war correspondents, sutlers, etc.

Execution of the convention
Articles 82 to 97 covers the implementation of this convention. Articles 82 and 83 contained two important clauses. "In case, in time of war, one of the belligerents is not a party to the Convention, its provisions shall nevertheless remain in force as between the belligerents who are parties thereto", and that the provisions of this convention continue to cover prisoners of war after hostilities up to their repatriation unless the belligerents agree otherwise or a more favorable regime replaces it.

Annex to the Convention of May 27, 1929, relative to the treatment of prisoners of war
The annex added detail to the provisions covering repatriation and hospitalization.

Parties

The following countries has either signed or/and ratified Convention:

Notes

See also
Geneva Convention on the Wounded and Sick (1929)

References

Further reading
 List of 53 countries that ratified the Convention. Countries that ratified the Convention are called State Parties. Not all countries that later were involved in World War II signed, e.g., the USSR. Japan did sign the Convention, but did not ratify it. They were a "state signatory." The list of 9 countries that were only state signatories.
 Copy of the convention held by the ICRC: Convention relative to the Treatment of Prisoners of War. Geneva, 27 July 1929.
 Copy of the convention as ratified by the United States Convention Between the United States of America and Other Powers, Relating to Prisoners of War; July 27, 1929. Held in the Avalon Project at the Yale Law School

Geneva Conventions
Interwar-period treaties
Anti-torture treaties
Treaties concluded in 1929
Treaties entered into force in 1931
Treaties of Argentina
Treaties of the First Austrian Republic
Treaties extended to Australia
Treaties of Belgium
Treaties of Bolivia
Treaties of Vargas-era Brazil
Treaties of the Kingdom of Bulgaria
Treaties of Canada
Treaties of Chile
Treaties of Colombia
Treaties of the Republic of China (1912–1949)
Treaties of Czechoslovakia
Treaties of Denmark
Treaties of the Kingdom of Egypt
Treaties of El Salvador
Treaties of Estonia
Treaties of Fiji
Treaties of the French Third Republic
Treaties of Nazi Germany
Treaties of the Second Hellenic Republic
Treaties of the Kingdom of Hungary (1920–1946)
Treaties extended to British India
Treaties of Indonesia
Treaties of the Kingdom of Iraq
Treaties of Israel
Treaties of the Kingdom of Italy (1861–1946)
Treaties of Jordan
Treaties of Latvia
Treaties of Liechtenstein
Treaties of Lithuania
Treaties of Mexico
Treaties of Monaco
Treaties of Myanmar
Treaties of the Netherlands
Treaties extended to New Zealand
Treaties of Norway
Treaties of the Dominion of Pakistan
Treaties of Papua New Guinea
Treaties of the Philippines
Treaties of the Second Polish Republic
Treaties of the Ditadura Nacional
Treaties of the Kingdom of Yugoslavia
Treaties of the Kingdom of Romania
Treaties of the Slovak Republic (1939–1945)
Treaties extended to the Union of South Africa
Treaties of Spain under the Restoration
Treaties of Sweden
Treaties of Switzerland
Treaties of Thailand
Treaties of Turkey
Treaties of the United Kingdom
Treaties of the United States
1929 in Switzerland
Prisoners of war